Princess Mabereng Seeiso of Lesotho (born Machaka Makara) is a member of the Royal Family of Lesotho. Princess Seeiso is the wife of Prince Seeiso of Lesotho and the sister-in-law of King Letsie III of Lesotho.

Biography 
She attended:

 Cape Peninsula University of Technology. Biomedical Technology Degree (1997–2000).
 University of Stellenbosch. Medical Microbiology (2001–2002).
 University of Westminster. MA Management Studies (2008–2010).

Princess Mabereng Seeiso and her husband, Prince Seeiso married on 15 December 2003, and they have three children:

 Prince Bereng Constantine Seeiso.
 Princess 'Masentle Tabitha Seeiso.
 Prince Masupha David Seeiso.

Since July 2012 is the owner and Managing Director of Mabeoana Crafts PTY LTD (Manufacturing.CMT - Textile industry. Import and export supply chain management).

She and her husband attended the Wedding of Prince Harry and Meghan Markle, the only foreign royals to do so.

References

Living people
Year of birth missing (living people)
Monarchy of Lesotho
African princesses
Lesotho royalty
Lesotho Christians
House of Moshesh
Princesses by marriage